The Charter School Growth Fund (CSGF) is a Broomfield, Colorado-based nonprofit philanthropic venture capital fund that identifies the country's best public charter schools, funds their expansion, and helps to increase their impact. CSGF is driven by a conviction that all children deserve great public schools in their communities.

Funding
In 2011, CSGF received a $1.25 million grant from the Bill and Melinda Gates Foundation. Between 2001 and 2010, CSGF has received annual grants from the Bradley Foundation which totalled $16.5 million. The foundation increased their support to $3 million in 2012. CSGF also received $101.6 million from the Walton Family Foundation.

Investments
Dreambox Learning was acquired by CSGF in 2010. Dreambox was heavily funded through venture capital contributed by Reed Hastings, John Doerr, Deborah Quazzo (founder and managing partner at GSV Advisors), and GSV Capital.

Governance
 Kevin Hall, CEO
 John J. Fisher, manages Pisces, Inc., the Fisher family’s investment portfolio (Fisher is a son of the Gap founders) majority owner of the Oakland As, and chairman of the KIPP Foundation, the nation’s largest charter school management company.
 James Rahn, president of the Kern Family Foundation founder of the nonprofit Educational Enterprises Inc. (EEI), a Wisconsin-based organization

See also
 Alliance for School Choice
 Bradley Foundation
 Broad Foundation
 DreamBox (company)
 Rocketship Education
 Walton Foundation

References

External links
 http://chartergrowthfund.org/

Financial services companies established in 2006
Organizations based in Colorado
Venture capital firms of the United States
Philanthropic organizations based in the United States